also nicknamed  is a football stadium in Nagano, Nagano, Japan. It is the home ground of J3 League club AC Nagano Parceiro and L.League club AC Nagano Parceiro Ladies.

External links
Official website

AC Nagano Parceiro
Sports venues in Nagano Prefecture
Football venues in Japan
Sports venues completed in 2015
Sport in Nagano (city)
2015 establishments in Japan